Han Moon-bae (born March 22, 1954) is a former South Korean international footballer.

He graduated from Hanyang University, and played for Lucky-Goldstar Hwangso. He was the first captain of Lucky-Goldstar Hwangso, and was honoured with the "K-League MVP Award" in 1985. After retiring, he stood for Hanyang University as a coach. He later moved to women's football club Suwon FMC WFC. He was appointed as manager of Suwon High School in October 2009

Club career 
1978 Seoul Trust Bank FC (Semi-professional)
1979–1980 Navy FC (Military service)
1981–1983 Seoul Trust Bank FC (Semi-professional)
1984–1986 Lucky-Goldstar Hwangso

Honours

Club
Lucky-Goldstar Hwangso
 K League (1): 1985

Individual
 K League MVP Award (1): 1985

External links
 

FC Seoul players
K League 1 Most Valuable Player Award winners
K League 1 players
Association football midfielders
South Korean football managers
South Korea international footballers
South Korean footballers
1954 births
Living people